The Rosewater School, now known as the Rosewater Apartments, is located in South Omaha, Nebraska, United States. Built in 1910, the building was named an Omaha Landmark on September 18, 1984, and added to the National Register of Historic Places in 1985.

About
Named for Edward Rosewater, the founder of the Omaha Bee newspaper and organizer of the Omaha School District, the Rosewater School is called "a fine example of the Second Renaissance Revival style of architecture." The brick, two-story structure was converted to apartments in 1985.

References

History of South Omaha, Nebraska
National Register of Historic Places in Omaha, Nebraska
Defunct schools in Omaha, Nebraska
Educational institutions established in 1910
Apartment buildings in Omaha, Nebraska
Czech-American culture in Omaha, Nebraska
School buildings on the National Register of Historic Places in Nebraska
1910 establishments in Nebraska